Operation Neretva '93 was an Army of the Republic of Bosnia and Herzegovina (ARBiH) operation against the Croatian Defence Council (HVO) in September 1993 on a 200 km long front from Gornji Vakuf to south of Mostar, one of its largest of the year, during the Croat–Bosniak War. The ARBiH made limited gains in the area of northern Herzegovina and around Mostar, but did not achieve a breakthrough to the southern Neretva, where the HVO retained control. The operation was halted in October. During the operation, dozens of Croat civilians were killed in the Grabovica and Uzdol massacres.

Operation
After most of Gornji Vakuf was captured by the Army of the Republic of Bosnia and Herzegovina (ARBiH) in August 1993, the fighting turned towards Prozor where the Croatian Defence Council (HVO) and the ARBiH fought during the previous months in nearby villages. Neither had full control of the area so both sides spent August and September in fighting along the hills and ridges near Prozor.

In September 1993, the Bosnian Government mounted the Neretva Operation, one of its most complex efforts to date, against the HVO. Units from the 1st, 3rd, 4th and 6th Corps of the ARBiH were subordinated to Sefer Halilović for the operation. The ARBiH troops launched coordinated attacks against HVO-held enclaves in the Lašva Valley and on the entire confrontation line from south of Gornji Vakuf to Jablanica, through Mostar and further southward to the Buna River. Units of the 9th Brigade, the 10th Brigade and the 2nd Independent Battalion, all subordinated to the ARBiH 1st Corps, were sent from Sarajevo to the Jablanica sector. In the Vitez area, during a simultaneous attack from the north and south, at one point the ARBiH broke through HVO lines in Vitez, but were ultimately forced back.

Between Prozor and Jablanica, the ARBiH pushed the confrontation line slightly to the west and advanced south toward Mostar after several days of fighting. The focus of the ARBiH attack was the HVO stronghold of Vrdi near the Neretva River in order to gain control of northern and western approaches to Mostar. In September 1993, after an artillery bombardment of Vrdi, the ARBiH infantry unsuccessfully attacked it and HVO forces managed to repel the attack. In Mostar, the ARBiH and HVO forces had clashes in the city and its Bijelo Polje and Raštani suburbs. The ARBiH made some limited gains by attacking outward from the city in three directions. The HVO responded with artillery shelling on 23 September of the eastern part of the city, controlled by the ARBiH, and an ineffective counterattack on 24 September. The use of artillery by the ARBiH and HVO further damaged the city, but neither side made significant gains. After several days of negotiations, a cease-fire was agreed on 3 October.

Grabovica and Uzdol massacres
During the night of 8/9 September, the massacre in Grabovica occurred when at least 33 Croat villagers in Grabovica were killed by members of the 9th Brigade and unidentified members of the ARBiH. Three combatants, Nihad Vlahovljak, Haris Rajkić and Sead Karagić were convicted for taking part in the killings. A few days later on 14 September, the ARBiH mounted an offensive east of Prozor. During this offensive the Uzdol massacre occurred in the village of Uzdol. 70-100 Bosnian troops infiltrated past the HVO defense lines and reached the village. After capturing the HVO command post the troops went on a killing spree. It was reported that 29 Croat civilians and one prisoner of war were killed by the Prozor Independent Battalion and members of the local police force.

ARBiH commander Sefer Halilović was indicted by International Criminal Tribunal for the former Yugoslavia on the basis of superior criminal responsibility (Article 7(3) of the Statute of the Tribunal) and charged with one count of violation of the laws and customs of war (Article 3 – murder), and found not guilty.

Aftermath
The HVO retained control over the area around Prozor and secured its forces rear in western Mostar. The ARBiH managed to secure ground between Jablanica and Vrdi and take control over the road from Grabovica through Potoci and Vrapčići into northeast Mostar.

See also
Grabovica massacre

Notes

References

Mass murder in 1993
Military operations of the Bosnian War
Bosniak war crimes in the Bosnian War
1993 in Bosnia and Herzegovina
September 1993 events in Europe
October 1993 events in Europe
Conflicts in 1993